Peter Ström (born January 14, 1975) is a Swedish former professional ice hockey right winger. He was drafted 200th overall by the Montreal Canadiens in the 1994 NHL Entry Draft.

Ström played in Elitserien for Västra Frölunda HC and Timrå IK. He also played in the Italian Serie A for SG Cortina, the Danish Metal Ligaen for SønderjyskE Ishockey and in the Norwegian GET-ligaen for the Sparta Warriors.

He has two children: Alexander and Lovisa.

External links

1975 births
Frölunda HC players
Living people
Montreal Canadiens draft picks
People from Halmstad Municipality
SG Cortina players
SønderjyskE Ishockey players
Sparta Warriors players
Swedish ice hockey right wingers
Timrå IK players
Växjö Lakers players
Sportspeople from Halland County